InSight Crime is a non-profit journalism and investigative organization specialized in organized crime in Latin America and the Caribbean. The organization has offices in Washington, D.C., and Medellín, Colombia.

InSight Crime has received funds from the Open Society Foundations and American University’s Center for Latin American and Latino Studies, and worked in Colombia together with the think tank Fundación Ideas para la Paz.

History 
InSight Crime was founded by Jeremy McDermott and Steven Dudley in April 2010 under the endorsement of the Fundación Ideas para la Paz (FIP) in Bogotá, Colombia, and with the financial support of the Open Society Foundations. By August 2010, the Center for Latin American and Latino Studies at the American University became a sponsor.

According to the organization, it was founded in order to create an online platform that "connects the pieces, the players and organizations" involved in Latin American crime and "the effectiveness of the initiatives designed to stop them."

Website 
InSight Crime launched its website in December 2010 with news on organized crime and profiles of drug trafficking organizations and criminal personalities in Colombia and Mexico. The website has since expanded to include information about every major country in the Americas.

The website intends to create an "information resource and networking tool designed for students, academics, analysts, researchers, policymakers, journalists, non-governmental workers, government officials and businesses to obtain the information and contacts they need to tackle the problems that organized crime increasingly presents in Latin America and the Caribbean."

Consultancy 
Apart from publishing information on its website, InSight Crime also conducts investigations across Latin America for private and government organizations.

See also
Southern Pulse

References 

Investigative journalism
Organizations established in 2010
2010 establishments in Washington, D.C.
Non-profit organizations based in Washington, D.C.